XHDY-FM is a radio station on 107.1 FM in Ciudad Morelos, Baja California. The station is owned by Radio Grupo OIR and carries a simulcast of XECB-AM 1460's Radio Ranchito programming.

History
XHDY began as XEDY-AM on 1080 kHz, which received its concession on February 22, 1966 after signing on in 1965. It was owned by Eloisa Eguía Tello de Brassea. Her brother, Antonio, had founded XEAA-AM and owned it for four years before dying in a 1942 car crash. By the mid-80s, XEDY was the last locally owned station in Mexicali, being courted by Francisco Aguirre Jiménez's Organización Impulsora de Radio (OIR). After initially turning down OIR's offer of affiliation, the network offered her son Antonio Brassea Eguía an administrative post, and she accepted; several years later, OIR bought the station.

XEDY was approved to migrate to FM in 2011, later shutting off its AM transmitter. Operation of the station also moved across the Colorado River from Ciudad Morelos to San Luis Río Colorado, Sonora.

In 2018, upon migrating two of its four AM stations in San Luis Río Colorado to FM, Radio Grupo OIR placed a simulcast of XECB-AM 1460, one of the two stations not migrated, on XHDY-FM; the Río Digital pop format moved to one of the new stations, XHLBL-FM 93.9.

References

Radio stations in Mexicali
Radio stations established in 1966